Podhorany (German: Maltern) is a village and municipality in Kežmarok District in the Prešov Region of north Slovakia.

History
In historical records the village was first mentioned in 1235.

Geography
The municipality lies at an altitude of 598 metres and covers an area of 11.02 km2. It has a population of about 2300 people.

Demographics
According to 2010 census total population had been 2333. In the village is sizeable Roma nationality, which had been claimed by 949 inhabitants, which is ca. 41% of the total population. In 2010 there had been 1165 males and 1166 females, what is ca. 50% for both.

Economy and infrastructure
In the village is foodstuff store, train stop, elementary school and a pub. Cultural sightseeings are gothic Roman Catholic and classical evangelical churches.

References

External links
https://web.archive.org/web/20160804131243/http://podhorany.e-obce.sk/

Villages and municipalities in Kežmarok District